The second season of I'm a Celebrity...Get Me Out of Here, which was commissioned on 16 July 2015, premiered on Network Ten on 31 January 2016. The season was won by Brendan Fevola who received $100,000 for his charity, and gave half ($50,000) to Paul Harragon's charity.

Celebrities

Guest celebrities

Results and elimination
 Indicates that the celebrity received the most votes from the public
 Indicates that the celebrity received the fewest votes and was eliminated immediately (no bottom two)
 Indicates that the celebrity was named as being in the bottom 2, or bottom 3

Tucker Trials

The contestants take part in daily trials to earn food. These trials aim to test both physical and mental abilities. Success is usually determined by the number of stars collected during the trial, with each star representing a meal earned by the winning contestant for their camp mates.

 The public voted for who they wanted to face the trial
 The contestants decided who did which trial
 The trial was compulsory and neither the public nor celebrities decided who took part 
 The contestants were chosen by the evicted celebrities
 The voting for the trial was of dual origin - the public voted for one contestant and the evicted celebrity voted for the second contestant

 Shane chose Brendan to participate in this trial with him
 Radio hosts Fitzy and Wippa entered as guests and disguised themselves as rangers, they sabotaged Paul's tucker trial so he wouldn't win any stars, but later in camp, Fitzy and Wippa gave the camp 10 stars worth of food & wine
 As a prank by Fitzy, Wippa was temporarily a camp member and had to participate in this tucker trial
 When Wippa was evicted from the jungle, he chose Brendan to participate with Havana in this tucker trial
 This being Laurina's 11th tucker trial will make Laurina the World Record holder of the most tucker trials completed by a person. The record was previously held by former American model Janice Dickinson, who completed 10 tucker trials on the seventh series of the UK version. Nazeem Hussain later beat Laurina with 14 trials.
 Brendan also won a special red star in this tucker trial.  The red star, which was another world-first record, gave the celebrities several condiments to add flavor to their meal
All of the celebrities failed at trying to receive a star, but Julia Morris tried a go at receiving at least one star for the campers, unfortunately she also failed but the campers received three stars anyway

Celebrity Chest Challenges

Two or more celebrities are chosen to take part in the "Celebrity Chest" challenge to win luxuries for camp. Each challenge involves completing a task to win a chest to take back to camp. However, to win the luxury item in the chest, the campmates must correctly answer a question. If they fail to answer correctly, the luxury item is forfeited and a joke prize is won. The luxury item is "donated" by a celebrity from the outside.

 The celebrities got the question correct
 The celebrities got the question wrong

 Brendan and Dean had to guess all correct to be able to take the celebrity chest.  One mistake would have resulted in them losing the chance to have the celebrity chest.

Trick or Treat

Two or more celebrities are chosen to take part in the challenge to win luxuries for camp. The campmates must correctly answer a question

 The celebrities got the question correct
 The celebrities got the question wrong

Camp Leader
Each celebrity in camp must vote for who they want to be Camp Leader, the celebrity who receives the most votes becomes the new Camp Leader
 Celebrity automatically became Camp Leader
 Voted in as Camp Leader
 Lost Camp Leadership

^ - These numbers indicate number of Camp Leaders not Weeks

Ratings

Ratings data is from OzTAM and represents the live and same day average viewership from the 5 largest Australian metropolitan centres (Sydney, Melbourne, Brisbane, Perth and Adelaide).

References

02
2016 Australian television seasons